Joubi Bridge, also called the Choobi Bridge, is a bridge in Isfahan, Iran. It was built in 1665, during the Safavid era.

The Joui Bridge is located between Khaju and Ferdowsi bridges. It is 147 meters long and 4 meters wide, with 21 arches. It was built during the reign of Shah Abbas II to irrigate and connect the king's gardens on both sides of the river. The bridge and the two parlours within were for the exclusive use of the shah and his courtiers. Nowadays the parlours are being used as tea houses.

References 

Bridges completed in 1665
Architecture in Iran
Bridges in Iran
Bridges in Isfahan
1665 establishments in Iran